Tysnes Church is a parish church of the Church of Norway in Tysnes Municipality in Vestland county, Norway. It is located in the village of Våge on the northern shore of the island of Tysnesøya. It is the church for the Tysnes parish which is part of the Sunnhordland prosti (deanery) in the Diocese of Bjørgvin. The white, wooden church was built in a long church design in 1867 using plans drawn up by the architects Georg Andreas Bull and Hartvig Sverdrup Eckhoff. The church seats about 370 people.

History
The earliest existing historical records of the church date back to the year 1329, but it was not new at that time. It was likely built during the 13th century. From 1685 to 1688, the old church was torn down and a new timber-framed long church was built on the same site. It was built by Erik Fyllingsnes from Lindaas and Oluf Bysemb from Osterøy.

In 1814, this church served as an election church. Together with more than 300 other parish churches across Norway, it was a polling station for elections to the 1814 Norwegian Constituent Assembly which wrote the Constitution of Norway. This was Norway's first national elections. Each church parish was a constituency that elected people called "electors" who later met together in each county to elect the representatives for the assembly that was to meet in Eidsvoll later that year.

During the 1860s, the parish determined that the old church needed to be replaced. In 1865, Georg Bull was hired to design the new building and Askild Aase was hired as the lead builder. The foundation stone was laid in 1867 and the new building was consecrated on 4 September 1868. The old church was torn down after the new building was completed. It was moved here because it was closer to the main village. Since the old architectural designs of the church were lost, the architect Hartvig Sverdrup Eckhoff was hired to design the newly rebuilt church. The building was consecrated on 27 September 1906. In 1977, the church was extensively remodeled, and then re-consecrated on 4 October 1977.

See also
List of churches in Bjørgvin

References

Tysnes
Churches in Vestland
Long churches in Norway
Wooden churches in Norway
19th-century Church of Norway church buildings
Churches completed in 1867
13th-century establishments in Norway
Norwegian election church